Chitradurga Lok Sabha constituency is one of the 28 Lok Sabha (parliamentary) constituencies in Karnataka state in southern India. This constituency is reserved for the candidates belonging to the Scheduled castes This constituency covers the entire Chitradurga district and part of Tumkur district.

Assembly segments
Chitradurga Lok Sabha constituency presently comprises the following eight Legislative Assembly segments:

Members of Parliament

Election results

See also
 Chitradurga district
 List of Constituencies of the Lok Sabha

References

External links
Chitradurga lok sabha  constituency election 2019 date and schedule

Lok Sabha constituencies in Karnataka
Chitradurga district